Flot or FLOT may refer to:

 Forward Line of Own Troops, a technical expression for a military front line
 Flot., taxonomic author abbreviation of Julius von Flotow (1788–1856), German botanist specialized in lichenology and bryology

See also
 First law of thermodynamics